is an active volcanic group of several overlapping stratovolcanoes, near the city of Shimabara, Nagasaki on the island of Kyushu, Japan's southernmost main island.

In 1792, the collapse of one of its several lava domes triggered a megatsunami that killed 14,524 people in Japan's worst volcanic-related disaster. The volcano was most recently active from 1990 to 1995, and a large eruption in 1991 generated a pyroclastic flow that killed 43 people, including three volcanologists.

The latter emerged during the eruptions of the early, eponymous Heisei era (1989–2019).

Overview 
Mount Unzen (or ) rises in the central part of the Shimabara Peninsula, Nagasaki Prefecture. It is located on the outer ring of the Chijiwa Caldera centering on Tachibana Bay in the west of the peninsula. As a result, the usage of only eight mountains (sometimes three mountains) was coined in a narrow sense, but historically it is a name that refers to the entire mountain range towering over the sea. It is often confused with the name of the oldest peak, .

In other words, it is supplied from a magma chamber beneath Tachibana Bay off Obama Onsen.

Unzen originally read "onsen" in the notation of a hot spring, but it was changed to the current notation when it was designated as a national park. An army radar base was built near the summit of Fugen-dake during the Pacific War, where about 100 people were stationed.

Eruptive history

Prehistoric to 1989 

Mount Unzen is part of Shimabara Peninsula, which has seen extensive volcanism over millions of years. The oldest volcanic deposits in the region date from over 6 million years ago, and extensive eruptions occurred over the whole peninsula between 2.5 and 0.5 million years ago.

The origins of the Unzen complex are traced to the formation of a graben through crustal faulting. Eruptions of dacitic lava began from a site slightly to the south of today's Mount Unzen and migrated north over time.

The volcano rapidly grew during its first 200,000 years, forming a very large cone. Later eruptions over the following 150,000 years filled in much of the graben. Initially, activity was dominated by blocky andesitic lava and ash flows, changing to dacitic pumice flows and airfall deposits from 500,000 to 400,000 years ago. The period from 400,000 to 300,000 years ago saw the emplacement of large areas of pyroclastic flow and lahar deposits; these form the major part of the volcanic fan surrounding the volcano. Beginning 300,000 to 150,000 years ago, thick phreatomagmatic deposits were laid down, suggesting the subsidence of the volcano into its graben was rapid during this period.

Activity from 150,000 years ago to the present has occurred at a number of sites around the volcanic complex, building four main domes at different times: the No-dake (70–150,000 years old), Myōken-dake (25–40,000 years old), Fugen-dake (younger than 25,000 years old) and Mayu-yama (4,000 years old) volcanic peaks.

In December 1663, Fugen-dake erupted, producing lava flows that covered forest for over an extension of 1 km. In the spring of the following year, there was a flood from the Kujuku Island crater, located on the southeastern flank of Fugen-dake at an altitude of 600 m. More than 30 were killed.

Unzen's deadliest eruption occurred in 1792, beginning with an earthquake in November of the previous year. On February 10, 1792, eruptions from Fugen-dake's Jigokuato crater began. Lava flows began on March 1 and continued for nearly two months. On March 22, volcanic plumes were produced, and lava also flowed out of the crater. On March 25, fumes rose and lava flowed down the northeastern part of Fugen-dake at a total length of 2.7 km. Eventually, the east flank of the Mayu-yama dome collapsed unexpectedly following a post-eruption earthquake, creating a landslide into Ariake Bay.

1990–1995

After 1792, the volcano remained dormant until it erupted again in November 1990.

It started with a slowly building active phase in 1968, with first earthquake swarms continuing until 1975. Large amounts of volcanic gas were ejected by Fugen, which affected about thirty cedar trees. In 1975, bird and animal carcasses were found in the surrounding area, and high concentrations of carbon dioxide were detected emitting from rock fractures. This area was also reported to have erupted volcanic gasses during the 1792 eruption. Earthquakes occurred sporadically from 1975, but there were 89 sensitive earthquakes, with strong shaking equivalent to a maximum seismic intensity of 5 from June to September 1979. At Shimabara Onsen, there was a place where the dissolved carbon dioxide concentration rose sharply from 1975 and increased by 30%. From April 1984, swarms occurred in Tachibana Bay  A magnitude 5.7 earthquake with a seismic intensity of 5 occurred in August near the south side of Hayama. As a result of this earthquake, uplift of the Shimabara Peninsula was observed, and magma supply from Tachibana Bay began.

Over the following year, earthquakes continued, and their hypocentres gradually migrated towards the summit. Finally on November 17, 1990 (Heisei 2), the first phreatic, or steam-blast, eruptions began ejecting from two places near a shrine at the summit. These eruptions only allowed vaporized hot water and ash to blow up from the two craters. In December of the same year, the volcano's state lulled and it seemed that it would end, but it erupted again on February 12, 1991, and on April 3, and 4th. The eruption intensified on May 9.

On May 15, the first debris flow caused by accumulated volcanic ash at the summit occurred, and a number of cracks were formed on the west side of the crater, extending in an east–west direction. After this inflation of the summit area, fresh lava was confirmed to be emerging on May 20, 1991. The lava was so viscous that it did not flow out, but instead became a dome which formed in the crater. The lava dome grew like a peach, eventually splitting and collapsing into four pieces under its own weight. After that, the dome continued to grow, continuously supplied with fresh lava from the crater underneath, creating new lobes that hung down from the summit. The 1st to 13th lobes were named in the order they were formed. Collapsing of the lava dome began to occur when the lobes, pushed out by the newly supplied magma, started to give way on the slope, causing a phenomenon known as pyroclastic flows (in which debris and volcanic gasses flow down the mountainside at speeds of 100 km/h).

The threat of further disastrous events prompted authorities to evacuate 12,000 residents from their homes. On June 3, 1991, the volcano erupted violently, possibly as a result of depressurisation of the magma column after a landslide in the crater. A pyroclastic flow triggered by the collapse of a lava dome reached  from the crater and claimed the lives of 43 scientists and journalists, including volcanologists Katia and Maurice Krafft and Harry Glicken.

The eruption activity continued until March 1995, with a temporary pause during its course. Between 1991 and 1994, the volcano generated at least 10,000 small pyroclastic flows, destroying about 2,000 houses. From 1993 onward, the rate of lava effusion gradually decreased, and eruptions came to an end in 1995.

The 1990–1995 eruptions of Unzen were the first eruptive activities in the world where pyroclastic flows were recorded clearly and continuously on video (in the past, many pyroclastic flows, such as those on Mt. Pelee, were recorded either as photographs or on small-scale videos).

1991 eruption 
Mount Unzen is perhaps most famous for its destructive and fatal eruption on June 3, 1991, at 4:08 pm. This eruption caused the first large-scale pyroclastic flow, unprecedented at the time, which killed 43 people in the evacuation zone. Among these were French volcanologists Maurice and Katia Krafft, as well as American geologist Harry Glicken. The other forty fatalities consisted largely of those involved in the mass media, as well as firefighters, police officers, farmers and taxi drivers.

Preparations 
The first debris flow in the Mizunashi River (located at the foothills of Unzendake) occurred on May 15, and others continued to occur in succession on the 19th, 20th, and 21st. Shimabara City made an evacuation recommendation to the towns in the Mizunashi River basin each time, resulting in smooth evacuation of residents and no human fatalities.

However, on May 20, when the lava dome appeared on Fugen-dake, it continued to grow day by day, and on the 24th part of the dome collapsed and the first pyroclastic flow occurred. After that, small pyroclastic flows occurred frequently, reaching a distance of 2.5 km east of the lava dome on the 26th, and 3.0 km on the 29th. On the 26th when the tip of a pyroclastic flow approached  from the nearest private houses, Shimabara City issued an evacuation recommendation for Kita-Kamikoba town, Minami-Kamikoba town, Shirataki town, Tenjin Motomachi, and Fudan Motomachi – all located in the Mizunashi River basin. The evacuation recommendation was carried out without trouble.

In order to capture the pyroclastic flow activity on film, the mass media chose a select spot within the evacuation advisory area. This shooting spot was located on the prefectural road in the village of Kita-Kamikoba, and was favored by the media because they were able to view Fugen-dake directly in front of them. The nickname "fixed point" was established. After the first pyroclastic flow on the 24th, more than a dozen media members were lined up at the "fixed point". In 1991, the media had started to use color photographs on the paper, and with the Fugen-dake disaster becoming an ongoing topic of coverage, the companies started competing for color photographs. The competition became even more intense as the Mainichi Shimbun succeeded in shooting nightly pyroclastic flows on May 28.

The fact that pyroclastic flows were being recorded in clear images for the first time attracted a great deal of attention from all over the world, and many volcanologists and government officials entered the evacuation advisory area for interviews and photography. On May 28, the Ministry of Construction (at that time officials of the Public Works Research Institute) released a picture taken when entering the path of previous pyroclastic flows below the lava dome, and another group on the afternoon of June 1 or 2. After entering the tip of the deposit path, they surveyed the site for about an hour, photographed the pattern and released it.

In addition, many visitors had begun to gather around Unzendake to see the plumes. In particular, since June 2 was Sunday, many visitors from other prefectures gathered around the Mizunashi River and observed the pyroclastic flows with binoculars and photographed them with video cameras. Traffic became heavy as a result.

However, on May 26, reporters from the Asahi Shimbun were warned that it was likely for them to be engulfed by the clouds, and in an evacuation recommendation, they were asked to leave the "fixed point" and find another area. According to a photographer who continued aerial photography of the lava dome from the helicopter, "The bottom fans out from the Sabo dam of the Mizunashi River, and if a large pyroclastic flow occurs, there is a strong possibility of it striking the 'fixed point'." The Asahi Shimbun abandoned their position and retreated past the Tsutsuno bus stop, to instead set up a point in Fukae Town outside the evacuation zone on the 28th, and switched to 24-hour shooting from there. At the "fixed point", the coverage in the vicinity was limited to patrols.

Similarly, the Japan Broadcasting Corporation (NHK) stopped shooting from within the evacuated area from the end of May and arranged for an unmanned camera in the Kamikoba area. But until the unmanned camera was ready, the photographer who had been lowered backwards was advanced to the Kamikoba area once again on June 1. The evacuation area then became smaller, since the commercial broadcasters had shot footage of bright red lava on May 30 and 31; the person in charge of the news program (who ordered the initial retreat of the front-line shooting staff) ordered more images shot like it. Kamikoba soon emerged again as a filming location of the press.

From May 15, when the debris flow evacuation advisory was issued, the fire brigade in charge of the Kamikoba district stayed either at the Minami-Kamikoba town fire brigade, or the Kita-Kamikoba town agricultural training center (which was initially an evacuation residence for locals). On May 29, due to the frequent occurrences of pyroclastic flows, they were evacuated from the firefighting station in Minami-Kamikoba town to the Shiratani Public Hall in the lower Mizunashi River, but on June 2, they returned to the Agricultural Training Center in Kita-Kamikoba town. This was because of the following reasons:

 Due to the temporary lull in rainfall, the occurrence of debris flow became more sparse, and it was judged that the area where the pyroclastic flows came out was a steep area and did not reach a gentle slope downwards. The evacuation for Tenjin Motomachi and Fudano Motomachi was lifted on the 1st, as well as Shiratani. Therefore, the fire brigade were no longer allowed to stay in the towns downstream from the Kamikoba area, as the evacuation advisories were now canceled.
 On May 29, preparations for the rainy season were resumed, and so was the removal of sediment from the Mizunashi River. But wire sensors that were installed to detect occurrences of debris flows were cut off on May 26 in a series of pyroclastic flows, and recovery of them was still expected to occur. As a result, it was decided to manually monitor the upstream part of the Mizunashi River. The agricultural training center in Kita-Kamikoba was favored for this, as it was located higher than the Minami-Kamikoba fire station.
 On June 2, several reports from a press conference by the Director General of Shimabara, detailed several TV station crews breaking into homes without permission, borrowing telephones and power outlets, and littering in the area. Also, after May 26, residents would often return to recover personal belongings from their homes, or enter the Kamikoba area to do housework or farm work, and it was considered necessary to guide their evacuation in the event of an emergency. As a result, it was convenient for the agricultural training school (which was close to the "fixed point") to monitor the behavior of the press and warn any nearby locals of danger.

From June 2 was Sunday, all 20 members of the Kamikoba area fire brigade slept at the agricultural training institute. They remained at the training center and were on alert.

Pyroclastic flows 
After 3:30 PM on June 3, small and medium-sized pyroclastic flows occurred frequently, and the first large-scale pyroclastic flow occurred at 3:57. Although this pyroclastic flow (and its resulting pyroclastic surge) did not reach the "fixed point", visibility in the vicinity deteriorated significantly as volcanic ash from the dispersing cloud covered the surroundings, in addition to the rainfall that had continued from the morning.

At 4:08 PM, the second large pyroclastic flow occurred, descending the Mizunashi River Valley and reaching 3.2 km to the east from the lava dome. Although the main body of the flow continued to follow the river, the resulting pyroclastic surge spread out in a fan shape once it had exited the valley mouth and continued further, hitting Kita-Kamikoba town (4.0 km away from the lava dome) and finally stopping near the Tsutsuno bus stop (5.0 km away). The pyroclastic flow also flowed down the Akamatsu-dani River, but changed direction due to a gust of wind from the south, allowing the residents, firefighters, and the shooting staff (who left their camera behind to capture world-famous footage of the eruption) to immediately escape the eruption.

At the "fixed point", members of the media initially left their chartered taxis and company cars on the road with their engine running, facing south so that they could escape immediately in case of an unforeseen event. However, the field of view was poor due to dispersing ash from the previous pyroclastic flow, as well as due to the presence of rain, and it was almost impossible to evacuate even from the windward side, as the pyroclastic surge that flowed from the Akamatsu-dani River would have cut them off. A fire brigade member of the agricultural training station, several hundred meters away from the "fixed point", assumed incorrectly that the roaring of the pyroclastic flow was caused by a debris flow instead, and was engulfed by the pyroclastic surge when he left the training station to check the Mizunashi River. Many members escaped from the evacuation advisory area on their own, but suffered severe burns and airway damage. As a result, 16 members of the media (including part-time students), 3 volcanologists (the Kraffts and Harry Glicken), 12 firefighters who were on guard, 4 taxi drivers, 2 police officers who came by police car to conduct evacuation guidance, 2 workers who were removing the city council election poster bulletin board, and 4 residents who were working in agriculture were killed. The disaster resulted in 43 dead or missing, and 9 injured. The photographer of the Yomiuri Shimbun newspaper died holding his Nikon F4. The camera recorded seven frames of the pyroclastic flow, although it was discolored by heat. All of the areas surrounding the "fixed point" where many casualties occurred, were within the advised evacuation zone.

A professional video camera used by an NTV cameraman who died in the pyroclastic flow was discovered in June 2005. The camera melted due to the high temperature generated by the pyroclastic flow and was severely damaged, but the tape it contained was playable, despite having been buried under volcanic deposits for almost fifteen years. The video received from the camera shows the reporters observing the first pyroclastic flow, and then continuing to report after having moved their position to the "fixed point". It also displays the police cars that announced evacuation, all unaware of the approach of the second large pyroclastic flow. The footage and sound were recorded and recovered, although heavily damaged and warped (the video ends when the cameraman notices a sound apparently associated with the generating pyroclastic flow, and asks "What's that sound?", whilst turning the camera in the direction of Mt. Fugen). This video was broadcast on October 16, 2005, and is now exhibited at the Unzendake Disaster Memorial Hall (Shimabara City) alongside the melted camera.

It is unclear as to what caused the unprecedented size of the second, large-scale pyroclastic flow on June 3. It has been suggested that the heavy ash-laden column that towered over the main flow, collapsed during its descent, causing the surge. It has also been pointed out that when the dome collapsed, 0.5 million cubic meters of hardened lava broke off, leaving a significant collapse scar afterwards, suggesting that the size of the dome collapse (rather than the column collapse) initiated the surge. Other explanations account the fact that previous lahars and pyroclastic flows filled the Mizunashi Valley, raising the level of the river-bed and making it more likely for the flow to "skip" ridges that would have once stopped it. According to the 2011 documentary  (French for Facing the Killer Volcano), the unexpected surge could have been caused by phreatic explosions as the main body of the pyroclastic flow proceeded down two waterfalls at the headwaters of the river, fragmenting the ash-particles of the avalanche and expanding the energy of the overlaying gas and ash cloud.

Effects and aftermath 
Pyroclastic flows continued over the next few days following the June 3 eruption, however, they were reportedly smaller and less frequent. Even so, rescue efforts and movements to recover the bodies of the victims, were disrupted and stalled due to the ever-present danger. Authorities eventually managed to recover 27 bodies and brought them to the Anyoji Temple. 4 of the victims' bodies were never recovered, and were reported as missing at the time, but presumed dead. Many of the recovered bodies were carbonized due to the extreme heat of the surge, and were identified by either dental records, or personal belongings they carried with them (e.g. wristwatches or cameras). 17 victims on the outer edges of the affected zone lived for a while, before succumbing later to their injuries (burns to their skin and lungs, or inhaled ash in their windpipe and lungs). The final victim reportedly died on August 8.

The collapse of the lava dome itself left a notable scar on the eastern side of the summit, and the pyroclastic flow and surge resulted in much damage in the Kamikoba district. Kita-Kamikoba was almost completely destroyed. Around 170 houses were devastated, many of them set alight by the intense heat of the ash. Pictures have shown that the pyroclastic flow left significant deposits near the mouth of the Mizunashi River Valley, enough to bury houses and the river itself. In contrast, the surge that detached from the flow left deposits of ash between 3 and 30 cm thick, however trees were flattened and many buildings continued burning until the next morning. The force of the surge was enough to push a car 80 m down-road.

Many of the casualties of the June 3 eruption could have been avoided if the danger of pyroclastic flows had been made more apparent beforehand. While the first pyroclastic flow on May 24 was shocking, many did not understand just how lethal such events could become. A reporter stated at the time: "I knew they were quite hot, but didn't know they could be accompanied by (pyroclastic surges). I thought we could escape by car, but I didn't know the extent at which it burned."

Twenty-five days after the event, the Japan Meteorological Agency revealed that while the first dome collapse was reported, much of the mass media and local residents were in a state of confusion about the danger of pyroclastic flows, and were not particularly concerned about them overall. The media originally reported that the pyroclastic flows seen on Fugen-dake at the time were "geologically small", which many regarded as "a scale that would cause no human fatalities". On May 26, a construction worker operating a Sabo dam in the upstream area of the Mizunashi River was caught in a pyroclastic flow; he survived but was sent to hospital with burns on his arms. Many thought that such burns could be prevented by wearing a long-sleeved shirt. The danger of the phenomena was not made clear. Furthermore, the number of pyroclastic flows from May 25 to June 2 had increased to 165, and all had stopped near the Sabo dam in the upper reaches of the valley. As a result, much of the media grew accustomed to the eruptions and no longer felt like they were in any danger.

Shimabara City issued an evacuation advisory for the villages near the base of Unzen on May 26, but responded to the residents' request that patrolling police officers allow them into the area to return to their homes (in preparation for prolonged evacuation). From the same day onward, a "district name sticker" was issued, and private cars with such a sticker were given permission to enter the evacuated area. For this reason, there were many residents doing laundry and field work at homes in the zone that had been declared dangerous. In the Kamikoba area, in particular, there were many farmers who made a living by cultivating tobacco leaf, but since they had been forced to evacuate for a long time (since the May 15th debris flows), their work grew stagnant and many of them were concerned. For this reason, on June 4, in collaboration with tobacco farmers in Annaka Town (which had not been evacuated), the residents of the Kamikoba area entered the evacuation zone to perform flower filling work later than usual.

Volcanologists did not talk about the danger of pyroclastic flows initially, because they feared residents would panic, especially those still working in the evacuated area. Residents were warned not to enter the evacuation advisory area by Shimabara City and the media, but since May, no concrete image was given regarding the danger of pyroclastic flows compared to that of debris flows (which had caused significant damage previously), and most residents did not take the warnings seriously. Many misunderstood them to be mere clouds of dust. According to the "Investigation of Disaster Information Transmission and Residents' Responses during the 1991 Unzendake Eruption" conducted in 1992, 75% of local residents recognized debris flows as more dangerous than pyroclastic flows before June 2. Only 15% perceived pyroclastic flows to be more dangerous. Furthermore, only 5% of the residents in the Kamikoba area recognized pyroclastic flows as "very dangerous". As was seen in the survey results, the volcanologist's warnings were not even understood by residents living in the most dangerous areas.

On June 3, a debris flow warning was passed out due to rain that began in the morning, and a party was held in Shiratani to celebrate the winner of the Shimabara City Council election on the 2nd. As a result of those two factors, most residents were withdrawn from the evacuation advisory area, and fortunately resulted in fewer victims.

Current status (post-1995)

Effects of the Heisei eruptions/restoration work 
The eruptive activity caused great damage to the Shimabara Peninsula, especially Shimabara City and Fukae Town. The main factor that led to damage were debris flows and lahars, initiated by heavy rain which destabilized pyroclastic flow and ash debris previously deposited on the slopes. The Mizunashi basin, as well as the Senbongi district and parts of Shimabara were severely damaged. In addition, there was concern about the collapse of Mt. Mayuyama, which previously caused the 1972 disaster. In this eruptive activity, however, Mt. Mayuyama protected the center of Shimabara from the pyroclastic flows.

In areas other than Shimabara and Fukae, there was ash fall depending on the wind direction, and at Kumamoto Airport, it had an impact on the arrival and departure of aircraft.

Since the eruptions, heavy rains have frequently remobilised pyroclastic material, generating lahars. Dikes have been constructed in several river valleys to channel lahar flows away from vulnerable areas, and warning systems and evacuation plans have been developed and deployed.

 Among the areas destroyed by the pyroclastic flows, the area around Heisei Shinzan and the upper part of the Mizunashi River are still designated as warning areas because of the possibility of collapses of the mountain.
 The Mizunashi River was completely filled by earth and sand dredging. Dykes and bridges have been strengthened. In the downstream area, there was too much sediment, so a new residential area was built on the sediment. In addition, a roadside station Mizunashi Honjin Fukae was installed on National Route 251.
 On the coast, a landfill (Heisei-cho) was built by the earth and sand transported, and the Unzendake Disaster Memorial Hall, Shimabara Reconstruction Arena and Shimabara Workers General Welfare Center were built there.
 10 million yen of support was provided to the residents with completely destroyed households. A new residential area – the "Nita housing complex" – was created on a hill for the victims.
 Various assistance was provided to prevent farmers from leaving the area. The Agricultural Improvement and Extension Center conducted interviews with all affected households (667 households) and held consultations for those who wished to resume agriculture until 1999. Training allowances were provided for those who plan to change the crops handled, and the reconstruction fund received a subsidy for the installation of a greenhouse or relocation costs. In parallel, the irrigation facilities in the affected areas were also developed. At the time of resuming agriculture in 2000, the number of farmers in the affected areas had decreased to 374. However, these support measures were successful, and the value of agricultural production in Shimabara City and Fukae Town recovered to almost the same level as before the disaster in 2005.
 On the bottom of the Ariake Sea off Shimabara city, volcanic ash had accumulated 20 to 80 centimeters of mud and it has had difficulty recovering naturally.
 Heisei Shinzan has been surveyed and climbed several times (the general public is prohibited from climbing because of the alert area), and a detailed observation of the lava dome was carried out. Even now, active fumaroles can be observed from several places on the summit.
 The Shimabara Railway Line passed through the area affected by the eruptions, but was restored on some elevated reduction, including a disaster zone in 2008. Shimabaragaiko Station continued to operate, but Kazusa Station was abandoned.

Mount Unzen was designated a Decade Volcano by the United Nations, in 1991 as part of their International Decade for Natural Disaster Reduction, due to its history of violent activity and location in a densely populated area.

Unzen Scientific Drilling Project (USDP)

In 1999, an ambitious project began at Mount Unzen to drill deep inside the volcano and sample magma in the 1990–1995 eruption conduit. The project hoped to shed light on some fundamental questions in volcanology, such as why magma repeatedly travels in the same conduits despite the solidification of magma in them at the end of each eruption, and how it can lose enough gas on its ascent to erupt effusively rather than explosively.

Drilling began with test bores to assess the viability of a deep borehole.

The main drill began in 2003, starting from the northern flank of the volcano with a  hole at an angle of 25 degrees from vertical.

This was attributed to hydrothermal circulation accelerating the cooling of the magma over the nine to ten years since the end of the eruption.

Rivers
Arie River starts at Mount Unzen and flows to the Ariake Sea.

Climate

See also

List of Special Places of Scenic Beauty, Special Historic Sites and Special Natural Monuments
List of volcanic eruptions by death toll
List of volcanoes in Japan
Mount Pinatubo
Unzen Ropeway
Unzen Onsen

References

Bibliography

Hoshizumi H., Uto K., Matsumoto A. (2001), Core stratigraphy of the Unzen Scientific Drilling: Volcanic History of the Unzen Volcano, Kyūshū, SW Japan, American Geophysical Union, Fall Meeting 2001
Hoshizumi H., Uto K., Matsumoto A., Kurihara A. (2004), Growth History Of Unzen Volcano, Kyūshū, Japan, American Geophysical Union, Fall Meeting 2004
Sakuma S., Nakada S., Uto K. (2004), Unzen Scientific Drilling Project: Challenging drilling operation into the magmatic conduit shortly after eruption, American Geophysical Union, Fall Meeting 2004
Uto K., Hoshizumi H., Matsumoto A., Oguri K., Nguyen H. (2001), Volcanotectonic history of Shimabara Peninsula and the evolution of Unzen volcano in Southwest Japan, American Geophysical Union, Fall Meeting 2001
Uto K., Nakada S., Shimizu H., Sakuma S., Hoshizumi H. (2004), Overview and the achievement of the Unzen Scientific Drilling Project, American Geophysical Union, Fall Meeting 2004

External links

  – Japan Meteorological Agency 
  – Japan Meteorological Agency
 Unzen Volcano – Geological Survey of Japan
Looking Into a Volcano: Drilling Unzen – Geotimes

Volcanoes of Kyushu
Stratovolcanoes of Japan
Subduction volcanoes
Decade Volcanoes
Active volcanoes
Mountains of Nagasaki Prefecture
Volcanoes of Nagasaki Prefecture
Complex volcanoes
Lava domes
Special Places of Scenic Beauty
Tsunamis in Japan
20th-century volcanic events
18th-century volcanic events
Highest points of Japanese national parks